The Canadian Society for the Study of Religion (CSSR;  []) is a Canadian academic society oriented to the scholarly study of religion. It was established in 1965.

Partner societies
As described on the CSSR website's "Our Partners" page, this society is affiliated with a number of other Canadian, American, and international academic societies focused on the study of religion. Among them, the CSSR maintains close liaison with the Société Québécoise pour l'Étude de la Religion. The society is also a member of the International Association for the History of Religions and the Canadian Federation for the Humanities and Social Sciences.

In 1971, the CSSR helped found the Canadian Corporation for Studies in Religion.

Presidents

 1967–1969: Eugene Combs
 1971–1974: Charles Davis
 1977: Louis Rousseau
 : 
 : Peter Slater
 1988: Bruce Alton
 Harold Coward
 1994–1996: Morny Joy
 1996–1998: William Closson James
 2001–2002: Randi R. Warne
 2005: Leona Anderson
 2006–2008: Peter Beyer
 2008–2009: Michel Desjardins
 2010–2011: Darlene Juschka
 2012–2015: Rubina Ramji
 2016–2020: Heather Shipley
 2020–2022: Paul Gareau
 2022–present: Diana Dimitrova

See also

 American Academy of Religion
 Canadian Theological Society
 List of learned societies

References

Footnotes

Bibliography

Further reading

External links
 
 Société Québécoise pour l'Étude de la Religion
 International Association for the History of Religions
 Canadian Corporation for Studies in Religion

1965 establishments in Canada
Learned societies of Canada
Organizations established in 1965
Religious studies